Juan Santa María Álvarez (Medellín, 15 December 1928 - 28 October 2007) was a Colombian civil engineer and philatelist who signed the Roll of Distinguished Philatelists in 1994. In 1985, the Fédération Internationale de Philatélie awarded him the FIP Medal for Research.

He was professor of mathematics at the Universidad Nacional de Colombia.

Publications
Historia Postal de Antioquia

References

Colombian philatelists
Signatories to the Roll of Distinguished Philatelists
1928 births
2007 deaths
Colombian civil engineers
People from Medellín
Academic staff of the National University of Colombia
Fellows of the Royal Philatelic Society London